William Jasper Blackburn (July 24, 1820 – November 10, 1899) was an American printer, publisher and politician who served in the United States House of Representatives from northwestern Louisiana from July 18, 1868, to March 3, 1869.  A Republican during Reconstruction, he was elected to the Louisiana State Senate, serving from 1874 to 1878.

Biography
Instead he ran unsuccessfully for the Republican nomination for lieutenant governor. He lost to the African American Oscar Dunn, who was elected to the second position on the Henry Clay Warmoth ticket.

After a four-year stint in the Louisiana Senate, Blackburn returned in 1880 to Little Rock, Arkansas, where he published the Arkansas Republican from 1881 to 1884 and The Free South from 1885 to 1892. He died in Little Rock and is interred there in Mount Holly Cemetery.

References

1820 births
1899 deaths
19th-century American newspaper publishers (people)
Louisiana state senators
Mayors of Minden, Louisiana
People from Homer, Louisiana
Politicians from Little Rock, Arkansas
Arkansas Republicans
Republican Party members of the United States House of Representatives from Louisiana
19th-century American journalists
American male journalists
19th-century American male writers
19th-century American politicians
Southern Unionists in the American Civil War